Juan de Castro, O.S.B. (died 1601) was a Roman Catholic prelate who served as Archbishop of Taranto (1600–1601).

Biography
Juan de Castro was ordained a priest in the Order of Saint Benedict.
On 20 March 1600, he was appointed during the papacy of Pope Clement VIII as Archbishop of Taranto.
he was consecrated bishop by Alfonso Gesualdo di Conza, Archbishop of Naples. He served as Archbishop of Taranto until his death on 11 November 1601.

References 

17th-century Roman Catholic archbishops in the Kingdom of Naples
Bishops appointed by Pope Clement VIII
1601 deaths
Benedictine bishops